The 2006 United States House of Representatives elections in Rhode Island were held on November 4, 2006 to determine who will represent the state of Rhode Island in the United States House of Representatives. Rhode Island has two seats in the House, apportioned according to the 2000 United States Census. Representatives are elected for two-year terms.

Overview

District 1 

 

Incumbent Democrat Patrick J. Kennedy defeated Republican Jon Scott, a member of the Ocean State Policy Research Institute. This district covers the northern part of the state.

District 2 

 

Incumbent Democrat Jim Langevin defeated independent Rod Driver. The district covers the southern part of the state.

References 

2006 Rhode Island elections
Rhode Island

2006